Relationships between Fiji and Papua New Guinea became strained in November 2005 in the wake of reports that 9 Fijian soldiers believed to be mercenaries had reportedly entered the disputed territory of the Kingdom of Me'ekamui on Bougainville in Papua New Guinea illegally and were arming and training a private militia on the island of Bougainville.

The Announcement
Bougainville secessionist King David Peii II (Noah Musingku) of Meekamui controls more than half of the island of Bougainville, following the civil war.  The PNG government has not recognized Bougainville sovereignty, but has granted autonomy to Bougainville.  Acting as Head of State of the Twin Kingdoms of Me'ekamui and Papala, Musingku announced in October 2005 that he was hiring a security force from Fiji to train his guards and other governmental personnel, as well as establish security and satellite and other telecommunications for his bank in Tonu. This decision was made with the full support of the 14 members of the Siwai Council of Chiefs. 
“We hereby support the agreement between the two authorities being the Royal Twin Kingdom governments and the Government of Fiji for the provision of the Fiji Security Forces and special bodyguards for our Royal Twin Kingdoms”, the chiefs said.

King David Peii/Musingku said that this Fijian security force had been hand selected “mostly Born-Again Christians", and that:

Among Security and bodyguards to be deployed by the Fiji Security forces to Bougainville are men and officers with strong Christian character who have behind them many years of peace keeping experiences and skills, earned from similar assignments overseas.

By the beginning of November, the arrival of the first contingent of eight Fijian soldiers was announced, along with the report of a public welcoming ceremony on 5 October 2005. The announcement included a photo of "the Fijians with the King after church services".
In the welcoming ceremony, a director of Training in the security company [Ronin High Risk Company Limited], Mr Aliki Moroca told the King and the gathering that their company vision is to provide security excellence and includes different units of medical, logistics, fire, military police and experts in several other fields....

“Our company members are Territorial Force soldiers having served in overseas observer and peacekeeping missions and active duties in Labanon, Sinai, Bosnia, Kosovo, Namibia, East Timor, Zimbabwe, Rhodesia, Bougainville and Iraq”, he said.
“Our company has many units including infantry, engineering, medical, signal units, fire department, logistics, aviation, naval, transport, maintenance, plus our special force unit”, he said. The Training program coordinator, Maloni Namoli, said their training program will include both the Kings palace guards, the Meekamui National Police and the Meekamui National Defense Force.
“We will train the palace guards the skills of escort and body guard services to the King both internally and on international and state visits around the world.”

The first wave 

The PNG government and press discovered the presence of the military mission a month after the announcement of their hire, on 15 November.  They claimed that the men, formerly connected with the now disbanded Counter Revolutionary Warfare Unit, had been hired as "bodyguards" by Noah Musingku, a follower of the late Bougainville separatist leader Francis Ona.  Musingku has in the past been involved with organizing U-Vistract, generally considered a failed pyramid scheme.  The men were reportedly giving arms training to students from schools around Tonu, in the Siwai district.

Papua New Guinea's Inter-Governmental Relations Minister, Sir Peter Barter, expressed serious concern about the men's activities, saying they had been lured to Bougainville by false promises.

On 18 November, the eight men confirmed that they were in Bougainville to train security officers, but denied being mercenaries.

The Fijian government formally apologised on 30 November for the incident.

Fijian government response 
Fiji's High Commissioner to Port Moresby, Ratu Inoke Kubuabola, said that the men had been identified.  He condemned their actions, saying, "It has brought disrepute to all the good work done in the past by our Fijian missionaries and soldiers who served in peace building and monitoring process on Bougainville." He had had to assure Joseph Kabui, the President of Bougainville's autonomous regional government, that the soldiers were no longer members of the Fiji Military Forces and that the Fijian government did not support them.

Prime Minister Qarase told Parliament on 17 November that if the 8 former CRW soldiers were found guilty, they would get no help from the Fijian government.  "Basically if you are in a foreign country and you break the law then you have to account for your action," he said.

Fiji's Home Affairs Minister, Josefa Vosanibola, issued a statement on 20 November calling on all Fijian citizens living or working abroad to respect the laws of their host countries, and to refrain from involvement in any activities that could tarnish Fiji's reputation.

The Fijian government has refused to label the men "mercenaries", however. Foreign Affairs spokesman Isikeli Mataitoga said that the government would not brand them as such until they had ascertained exactly why they were on Bougainville.

Missionary visas 
The Fiji Live new service reported the same day that the 8 former soldiers were recruits of the Ronin Security firm, whose founder Ilisoni Ligairi was implicated in the Fiji coup of 2000.  According to Fiji Live, the recruits travelled to Bougainville ostensibly as missionaries, and it was reported on 18 November that three of the men belonged to the Christian Mission Fellowship, a Fijian church group, and that at least two of them had entered Papua New Guinea on missionary visas.

Pastor Manasa Kolivuso of the Every Home for Christ Church denied on 20 November that he or the church had authorized the two men connected with the church to travel to Papua New Guinea as missionaries.

Also on 20 November, it was revealed that Suliasi Turagabeci, the official secretary to Fiji's President, had supported the visa applications of two of the men, Freddy Rokondi and Sam Baroi.  He had supplied them with references testifying that he had known them for more than a decade, and asserting that they were devout Christians and trustworthy men.  The men were subsequently granted missionary visas.

National security threat 
Military spokesman Captain Neumi Leweni said that the actions of the mercenaries constituted a threat to national security in Fiji.  He blamed government policy, including its promotion of the controversial Reconciliation, Tolerance, and Unity Bill, for fostering a "do whatever you want syndrome" of which this incident was a symptom.

On the other hand, former Prime Minister Sitiveni Rabuka, who founded the CRW unit, defended the mercenaries, saying they had nothing else to do.  He said that the disbanding of the unit following the coup and mutinies of 2000, coupled with the tarnishing of the reputations of the soldiers involved, had left the men unemployed and unemployable.  He called on the government to ensure that others in similar circumstances do not likewise end up in illegal activities.

Fears of danger 
Meanwhile, Kubuabola said that the 8 men would be in great danger if the charges against them were substantiated.  He appealed to Fijians living in Papua New Guinea to help them return to Fiji. Foreign Minister Kaliopate Tavola, for his part, had ascertained that 2 of them were willing to do so, but was unsure of the others' intentions.

Meanwhile, a separatist group on Bougainville threatened to "destroy or kidnap" the men if they failed to leave the island within seven days.

Rakai negotiates 
It was announced on 21 November that the Fijian High Commission in Port Moresby would send Emosi Rakai, the First Secretary at the High Commission, to Buka to assist the Bougainville government to repatriate the Fijians.  Efforts to communicate with the Fijians themselves were proving futile, said Foreign Minister Tavola.  Telephone calls were invariably answered by a third person saying that the men were not available, he said.  High Commissioner Kubuabola said that the diplomat being sent knew three of the mercenaries well, and expressed hope that they would cooperate.  Bougainville's autonomous government, he said, was anxious to get the men off the island before the central government intervened.

When Rakai arrived in Buka however, his efforts to contact the men were reportedly unsuccessful. "They were given orders not to speak to me," Rakai said. Rakai's statement conflicted with two earlier reports, one saying that he had in fact made contact but had failed to persuade them to board a flight to Port Moresby and then return to Fiji.  High Commissioner Kubuabola later said that the meeting had not taken place, and cited bad weather as a likely explanation.

Kubuabola announced on 29 November, however, that Rakai had succeeded in contacting the men over the weekend, and had persuaded two of them, Fereti Rokodi and Semi Baroi - believed to be leaders among the eight - to fly to Port Moresby to be interviewed.  Rakai meanwhile expressed fears that the remaining six were being held against their will.  Musingku would not let them leave for "security reasons," he told Papua New Guinea's Post-Courier newspaper.

Rokodi and Baroi were to be questioned by Papua New Guinea immigration officials on possible breaches of their visa conditions.  Papua New Guinea's Acting Prime Minister Sir Moi Avei had earlier told Pacific Beat on Radio Oz the previous day that the men were a threat to national security.

After arriving in Port Moresby, Rokodi told Fijian and Papuan officials interviewing him that he and his colleagues were missionaries, not mercenaries, and were on Bougainville to preach the Christian gospel.  They considered the opportunity the fulfillment of a vision they had had in 1999, he said.  They were also there, he claimed, to check on "investments" that Fijians had made, and to get the promised returns from Musingku.

Expulsion order 
Meanwhile, Kubuabola said that all eight Fijians wanted to return home.  On 5 December, they were ordered by the government of Papua New Guinea to leave the country within 15 days.  Then on 9 December, with Rakai still attempting to persuade the men to leave, the government of Papua New Guinea announced its intention to charge the men for breaching the conditions of their visas, and gave them till 20 December to leave.  On 12 December, having returned to Tonu with Rokodi in an effort to persuade the remaining six to leave, reported that he had failed.  All six had signed statements for the Fijian High Commission that of their own accord, they refused to leave Bougainville and were applying for work permits.

On 19 December, Bougainville's Vice-President Joseph Watawi said that the deadline for the men to leave had been extended till 28 December.  If they refused to leave, they would be arrested, he declared. Meanwhile, reports indicated that Isaia Baro, one of the six remaining in Tonu, had left the area and had flown to Port Moresby, for interrogation by immigration authorities.

On 20 December, the Papua New Guinea government threatened the men with treason charges if they failed to leave the country.  The next day, Papua New Guinea's National newspaper reported that authorities were monitoring the waters in the region of the Solomon Islands, lest the men attempt to leave the country illegally by boat.  They next day, it was announced that the three men who had left Tonu would be charged and deported for immigration offences; the remaining five would similarly be charged and deported when apprehended, the Fiji Times reported.

Papua New Guinea's Post Courier newspaper reported on 23 December that the five men remaining in Tonu had hopes of receiving the F$1 million each that Musingku had promised them, and would not leave until paid.  This refusal was repeated on 27 December.  "Because there is strong hope that Musingku will pay out, the Fijians do not want to leave Tonu without the money promised," the Post Courier quoted one informant.

Musingku, meanwhile, is reported to have tightened security at his Tonu hideout following rumors of troop deployments in the vicinity.

On 23 December, the Fiji Village news service quoted Fiji's acting Foreign Minister, Pita Nacuva, as saying that the men's activities could make it much more difficult for Fijian nationals to obtain entry permits in Papua New Guinea in future.

The deadline expired on 28 December, with the five men still in Tonu.  There was no immediate word as to whether, or when, police would carry out their threat to use force to remove the men.

Meanwhile, Fiji Television revealed on 29 December that the three men who had left Tonu were under house arrest in Port Moresby.  It was subsequently reported by Fiji Village on 3 January 2006 that the government of Papua New Guinea had decided to deport them without laying any charges.

Bougainville President Joseph Kabui announced on 16 January that armed men would be sent into Tonu to "smoke out" the five Fijians remaining, who were said to be training 30 militiamen.

Detained in Tonu; one escapes from Port Moresby 
The Fiji High Commission in Port Moresby revealed on 6 January 2006 that Musingku was holding the five remaining men and refusing to release them.  Diplomat Emosi Rakai quoted Musingku as telling him the men had signed a two-year employment contract, to which he was holding them.

Isikeli Mataitoga, the Chief Executive Officer of Fiji's Foreign Affairs Ministry, revealed on 8 January that Fereti Rokodi, one of the three being held in Port Moresby, had escaped to Brisbane, Australia, on the 5th.  He would be arrested on his return to Fiji, Mataitoga said.

Solomon Islands immigration officials revealed to the Solomon Star newspaper on 10 January 2006 that telecommunications specialist Isaia Seruvatu Baroi, one of the men ordered out of Papua New Guinea, had arrived in Honiara en route to Fiji.  Another who had been held in Port Moresby had already returned to Fiji via Australia, while a third was waiting for his airfare, Baroi told the Fiji Times the next day.  On 12 January 2006, however, the Fiji Live news service reported that Semi Baroi, too, had returned to Fiji the previous weekend.

The Fiji Village news service reported on 27 January that the five Fijian nationals remaining in Bougainville had reiterated their earlier decision not to leave until paid for the work undertaken.

Baroi's story 
On his return to Fiji, Isaia Baroi, a native of Lomanikoro in Rewa Province and a director of Transcom Fiji Limited, told the Fiji Times that he had gone to Bougainville on a telecommunications business trip, hoping to secure a deal with a customer he had never met.  His seven colleagues had gone as security staff, he said, and found the local situation to be very different from what they had been led to expect.  Revelations that he and his colleagues had been accused of being mercenaries had come as a complete surprise to him, he said.

Radio New Zealand, meanwhile, reported that the men had been hired to secure a bank in Tonu.

Military to flush rebels out 

PNG Military Commander Peter Ilau told The National newspaper on 14 March that the Military would move into Bougainville to oust Musingku and his Fijian backers if asked to do so by the Bougainville autonomous government.

The second wave 
Noah Musingku, who is also known as  "HM King David Peii II" Head of State of "Kingdom of Papala", spoke publicly on 22 November 2005.  His official newspaper, the Papala Chronicles, reported that ten more Fijian soldiers were expected to arrive in Bougainville soon, with more than 35 expected by the end of November 2005.  The Papala Chronicles identified the Ronin Company as a source of the men, along with members of a private telecommunications company, who would be employed to install all telecommunication systems in Tonu, the headquarters of the "kingdom" of Papala, and eventually throughout Bougainville.  On 23 November, the Fiji Live news service reported that 30 men, most or all of whom were believed to be unemployed, had begun seeking a medical clearance to travel to Bougainville, and that a further 300 were expected later on, having been lured with promises of F$1 million each.

Meanwhile, the central government of Papua New Guinea has told the autonomous government of Bougainville that if it fails to step in to evict the eight Fijians, central authorities will intervene.

Fiji's Employment Minister Kenneth Zinck said on 23 November that he welcomed the recruitment of former Fijian soldiers for work in Bougainville, provided that it was for a legitimate undertaking. The government would be concerned if they were being hired as mercenaries, and wanted to see their employment contracts prior to their departure, he said. National Alliance Party leader Ratu Epeli Ganilau, a former Commander of the Fijian Military, concurred, but in an interview with Australia's ABC Television's Asia Pacific Focus programme on 27 November that in the absence of proof, it was wrong to assume that the men were up to no good.  He expressed concern that the men may have been duped by the promise of a million dollars' cash each, and said he hoped that "cool heads" would prevail in the event of the promise coming to nothing.

Fiji's Military Commander Commodore Frank Bainimarama told the Fiji Live news service on 13 December that Musingku had contacted him several months earlier, offering F$35 million for his cooperation with respect to "security work" in Bougainville.  Bainimarama recognized the scheme as an obvious "con job", he said, and did not reply to the letter.

Problems in Tonu and in the Solomons 
The Fiji Live news service had reported on 1 February that parents in the Tonu area were refusing to send their children to school because of security fears linked to the Fijian agents.

According to the Fiji Times and Papua New Guinea's Post Courier newspaper, a group of nine armed men had raided the Puma logging camp on Oavu Island in the Solomon Islands on 27 January, stealing money, fuel, a boat and outboard motor, and communication equipment. This was not the first such raid, and Bougainville police were said to be investigating a possible link between these men and the five Fijian agents remaining on Bougainville.

Solomon Islands Police Commissioner Shane Castles said on 7 February that no more former Fijian soldiers would be permitted to enter Papua New Guinea through the Solomons. "These people are not respecting the laws of another sovereign nation and are basically involved in illegal activities," he told his Fiji counterpart, Andrew Hughes.  His statement coincided with an admission from Fiji's Foreign Minister Kaliopate Tavola that his government was powerless to prevent the recruitment of former soldiers to work with foreign security firms.

Twelve arrested, eleven deported 
This followed the arrest in the Solomons' capital, Honiara, of twelve Fijian men, all former United Nations peacekeepers in the Middle East, led by Rusiate Seuta (a former Warrant Officer).  According to Fiji Village, the suspicions of Solomons' officials had been aroused by the expressed wish of the men to fly to Buka, Bougainville, and had subsequently found irregularities on their immigration declaration forms.  Police investigations discovered that the men planned to fly to Taro, in the Solomons' Province of Choiseul, and then illegally cross the border into Bougainville by boat.

Eleven were deported to Fiji on 7 February; one (31-year-old Kinivuwai Vakatawanavatu Sulua) had escaped.

On the 8th, Foreign Affairs Ministry Chief Executive Officer Isikeli Mataitoga told Fiji Live that the Ministry had reported the men's activities to the police, to investigate whether they had violated any Fijian laws.

Foreign Minister Tavola revealed on 9 February that the men would be required to return in two weeks to the Solomon Islands at the expense of their recruiting agency, to answer charges against them laid by the Solomons police. Military spokesman Captain Neumi Leweni told Fiji Live that although they remained enlisted soldiers, any private employment contracts were their own responsibility.

Police Commissioner Andrew Hughes said that both the men and their recruiting agency were being monitored.

Radio New Zealand reported that Solomons police were watching the airport and all sea ports, which searching for Sulua, who remained at large.  Speaking to Fiji Live on 12 February, a relative (who requested anonymity) pleaded with him to surrender and return to his Nasinu home.

The same day, Fiji Live reported that Sulua had been in trouble with the law previously.  In the 1990s, he had allegedly been deported from the United Kingdom while serving in the British Army.

Radio Australia reported on 13 February that Solomons police were investigating two reported sightings of Sulua in outer suburbs of Honiara.

Sulua captured 

The Brisbane Courier Mail reported on 27 February that Sulua had been arrested in Tetere, some thirty kilometers outside Honiara.  Police said they were investigating assistance given to Sulua by members of the public, including some Solomon Islanders of Fijian origin.

The third wave 

Solomon Islands Police Commissioner Shane Castles was quoted on 21 March 2006 as saying that police were aware of a Fijian company which was recruiting former Fijian soldiers and facilitating their movement through the Solomons to Bougainville.

On 20 March, Fiji Live reported Bougainville's President, Joseph Kabui, as saying that up to one hundred Fijian mercenaries could be on their way to the island.  Speaking on Australian national television, he called on the Fijian and Papua New Guinea governments to prevent their passage.

Meanwhile, Papua New Guinea security official Emmanuel Mungu said on 22 March that five Fijian were still with Noah Musingku.

Peacekeepers Association blames government 
Speaking to Fiji Village on 11 February 2006, Fiji Peacekeepers Association spokesman Taniela Senikuta blamed government policy for the illegal activities in which some former soldiers were engaged.  While returned servicemen from World War II received pensions, soldiers returning from peacekeeping duties did not, he said.  This made employment abroad, even in questionable ventures, attractive, he claimed.

United Nations request 
Fiji Live reported on 3 March that the United Nations had asked Fiji and Papua New Guinea to allow teams to investigative presence of former Fijian soldiers in Bougainville.

Sources 
 For background on Fijian private military contractors in Iraq: “Fiji, the war in Iraq, and the privatisation of Pacific island security” .

References

Autonomous Region of Bougainville
Politics of Papua New Guinea
2005 in Papua New Guinea
2005 in international relations
Fiji–Papua New Guinea relations